Hrnčiarska Ves is a village and municipality in the Poltár District in the Banská Bystrica Region of Slovakia.

Genealogical resources

The records for genealogical research are available at the state archive "Statny Archiv in Banska Bystrica, Slovakia"

See also
 List of municipalities and towns in Slovakia

References

External links
 
 
http://www.e-obce.sk/obec/hrnciarskaves/hrnciarska-ves.html
Detailed information and map
Surnames of living people in Hrnciarska Ves

Villages and municipalities in Poltár District